Strontium 90 were a short-lived British band active in 1977 whose members were Mike Howlett (bass, vocals) from the band Gong, Sting (vocals, guitar, bass), Stewart Copeland (drums), and Andy Summers (guitar).  The band is most notable for introducing Summers to Sting and Copeland, who as a trio would go on to massive success as the Police.

Strontium 90 was formed in mid-1977 by Howlett after he quit Gong and recruited Sting and Summers to participate in a new project. Chris Cutler was unavailable to play drums, so Sting brought along Copeland, with whom he had been playing in an early lineup of the Police.

Strontium 90 recorded several demo tracks at Virtual Earth Studios, and then performed at a Gong reunion concert in Paris on 28 May 1977. An album with some of these studio and live tracks was released in 1997 under the name Strontium 90: Police Academy on Ark 21 Records.  The foursome also performed at a London club as The Elevators in July 1977.

Footnotes

References
 Mike Howlett, "Police Academy" album sleeve notes, Pangaea Records, 1997.
 Sting, Broken Music, Simon & Schuster, 2003. 

The Police
Musical quartets
Musical groups established in 1977
Musical groups disestablished in 1977
Musical groups from London
English rock music groups
English new wave musical groups
1977 establishments in England
1977 disestablishments in England